Wladimir Klitschko vs. Ruslan Chagaev, billed as "Knockout Auf Schalke", was a professional boxing match contested on 20 June 2009 for the IBF, WBO, IBO, and vacant The Ring heavyweight championship.

Background
After he had successfully unified the IBF and WBO belt with his outsided decision victory over Sultan Ibragimov in February 2008, Wladimir Klitschko had defended his titles with knockouts of Tony Thompson and former unified champion Hasim Rahman. He had agreed to face former unified cruiserweight champion David Haye in Germany on 20 June 2009, but Haye withdrew because of a back injury.

Chagaev had won the WBA title from Nikolay Valuev in April 2007 by a majority decision. His scheduled rematch with Valeuv was twice cancelled due a viral infection and a torn Achilles tendon both suffered by Chagaev. After the second cancellation the WBA named Chagaev their "Champion In recess." The rematch was scheduled for a third time on 30 May 2009, but Chagaev failed his medical exam.

After Haye pulled out, Klitschko and Chagaev agreed to meet at the Veltins-Arena with the vacant Ring magazine heavyweight belt on the line. Also, this was the first time that the Lineal championship had been contested since Lennox Lewis had beaten Vitali Klitschko in June 2003.

The fight
Veltins-Arena with capacity of over 61,000 seats was sold out, making the audience the biggest for boxing in Germany since 1939, when Max Schmeling knocked out Adolf Heuser in front of 70,000 people in Stuttgart. Klitschko dominated the fight, keeping Chagaev at the end of his jab and throwing straight right hand whenever necessary. Klitschko dropped Chagaev near the end of the second round, and was gradually fighting more aggressively as the fight progressed. Chagaev's trainer Michael Timm did not allow Chagaev to come out for the tenth round, prompting the referee to wave the bout off, declaring Klitschko the winner by corner retirement (RTD).

Aftermath
This win was significant for Klitschko because even though the WBA title was not on the line, many saw Klitschko as the rightful champion. Inmediatly after this bout Chagaev would lose his "Champion In recess" status and would not fight for eleven months. Klitschko would make two defences, one against Eddie Chambers and the other one a rematch with former WBC champion Samuel Peter, before a unification bout with then WBA beltholder Haye in July 2011.

Fight card
Confirmed bouts:

Broadcasting

References

2009 in boxing
International Boxing Federation heavyweight championship matches
World Boxing Organization heavyweight championship matches
Klitschko brothers
June 2009 sports events in Europe
Boxing in Germany
2009 in German sport
Boxing matches